Dark Horse Brewing Company is a brewery and tap room in Marshall, Michigan. Its year-round brews include Crooked Tree India Pale Ale, Amber Ale, Raspberry Ale, Reserve Special Black Ale, Boffo Brown Ale, Sapient Trip Ale, and Scotty Karate scotch ale, with several seasonal and experimental brews. The brewery has won several medals at various brewing competitions. Its taproom features 3200+ mugs that fill the ceiling and walls, owned by its mug club members.

History
Dark Horse Brewery began as a restaurant owned by Bill Morse. His son Aaron Morse suggested a redesign of the restaurant into a brewpub. The brewpub opened on West Michigan Avenue in Marshall. After converting its brewpub license into a microbrewery license in 1998, the taproom moved in 2000 to S. Kalamazoo Road. In 2010, Dark Horse added a general store that sells merchandise and home brewing supplies. 

In early November 2010, the taproom was broken into and the building burned, in a suspected arson. Reconstruction began later that month.

In 2014, a reality show called Dark Horse Nation, featuring the company and its employees, premiered on The History Channel.

In 2019, with $12,018 in unpaid property taxes and $1.5 million in unmet mortgage payments, Dark Horse was purchased by Roak Brewing Co. of Royal Oak, Michigan. In 2021, ROAK Brewing closed its Royal Oak Michigan tap room and brewery and consolidated all of its brewing operations in Marshall, including a separate tap room and kitchen located on the Dark Horse campus.

Awards
The craft beer-rating website RateBeer ranked Dark Horse 29th in its 2013 list of Best Brewers in the World.

References

External links

Beer brewing companies based in Michigan
Food and drink companies established in 1997
Companies based in Michigan
1997 establishments in Michigan
Calhoun County, Michigan